The Cadillac V series (stylized as V-Series), is a line of high-performance vehicles tuned by the General Motors Performance Division for the Cadillac division of General Motors. Models in the V series tend to vary from one generation to the other. It was introduced in 2003.  

The V series was initially created as part of the 2000s Cadillac rebranding and  the new 'Art & Science' design language to compete directly with German rivals such as BMW M and Mercedes-AMG. The first-ever V series model was the 2004 Cadillac CTS-V which became a successful seller and steered Cadillac in the new direction for the following decade.

The letter "V" was chosen as a salute to post-WWII Cadillacs that featured a V-shape ornament below the crowned wreath logo, the shape itself was never recognized as a letter back then. Most V series Cadillac cars traditionally include high-performance V8 engines, transmissions, revised suspension systems (MagneRide Control), revised interiors, aerodynamics, and more aggressive bodywork which is intended to improve the vehicles' aerodynamic performance as well as differentiate them from their normal production counterparts.

Cadillac has also re-entered motorsport competition with their CTS-V.R, a joint venture between GM Performance Division and Pratt & Miller race team, most famous for their role in GM's Le Mans-winning Corvette C5.R program.

In 2009, the second-generation CTS-V sedan achieved a lap time of 7:59.32 at the Nürburgring Nordschleife, which was the fastest documented time for a production sedan on factory tires—until the Porsche Panamera Turbo clocked a time of 7:56 in July 2009—thanks to a heavily-tuned  "LS9" EATON-supercharged  V8 engine that was borrowed from Corvette. The  engine was renamed as "LSA" and it produces 556 horsepower as well  of torque. The same "LSA" engine is used in CTS-V coupe and wagon.

History 
The V-Series development emerged from the mindset taking over at General Motors back in late 1990s and early 2000s, where Cadillac was struggling against imports from Japan and Europe. GM was eager to bring Cadillac back to its mantra "Standard of the World" and the new 'Art & Science' design language that matured in the late nineties auto shows gave the brand an aggressive and edgy leap ahead that looked promising in shaking the dusty past of old Cadillacs.

The team working on the first generation CTS recognized early on that a high-performance variant was necessary, not only to rival competition and display  Cadillac's resurgence, but also to pull young and new customers to Cadillac -something GM and Cadillac were longing for.

In 2004, the first-ever Cadillac V-Series was the CTS-V. The first-generation CTS-V became a cultural icon recognized quickly in movies like The Matrix.

First-generation V series 

The first V-series model of the Cadillac family was the CTS, which was built on GM Sigma Platform like the core model. Since a V8 engine was used, it required a unique engine cradle distinct from the base CTS V6. Larger anti-roll bars and larger shocks were also added. The spring rate was significantly increased. Right at front above the ground, GM LS engine V8 from the C5-generation Corvette Z06 was fitted and coupled—also from the C5 Z06—with a six-speed Tremec manual transmission.

XLR hard-top was the second Cadillac to join the V series. It was an ultra-luxury segment car, first introduced in 2005 and it shared platform with Chevrolet Corvette (C6). The XLR-V used a supercharged Northstar engine series. For the XLR-V, the engine was certified by the SAE to produce 443 hp (330 kW) and 414 lb·ft (561 N·m). The supercharger and four intercoolers were built into the intake manifold. A six-speed automatic transmission, larger brakes from the Z51 Corvette, and 19-inch wheels were used.
The XLR base price was $98,000 and by 2008 it reached $101,300 making it one of General Motors' most expensive vehicles of all time.

A year after XLR-V launch and two after CTS-V, in 2006, Cadillac started producing STS-V sedan that also featured the Northstar V8 engine from XLR-V. However, the supercharged  Northstar V8 in STS-V had 26 more horsepower and 25 more lb-ft of torque than XLR-V's. The engine was mated to a driver-adjustable transmission with two shifting modes, larger brakes by Brembo, larger ten-spoke alloy wheels (18 in × 8.5" front, 19 in × 9.5" rear), Pirelli run-flat tires, a faster steering ratio, and a stiffer suspension than the standard STS.

Second-generation V series

The second-generation V series was exclusive to the CTS since STS and XLR were rolled out of production. For 2009, Cadillac introduced the second-generation CTS-V that was built on GM Sigma II Platform. It was a rear-wheel drive, powered by a  LSA EATON-supercharged V8 that was based on LS9 V8 from—what was then—recently released Corvette ZR1. The engine generates 556 horsepower and 551 lb-ft of torque. The second-generation CTS-V was a major milestone in modern-day Cadillac that advanced the brand's "Art & Science" philosophy further ahead. It broke a Nürburgring lap-record which made it—back then—the fastest production sedan.

When asked in 2009 about the possibility of a CTS-V wagon, the GM Vice Chairman at that time, Bob Lutz, replied, "... should sufficient demand materialize, there is no reason why we couldn't do a V-series wagon, and I would be standing in line for one, just ahead of you." GM decided to move forward, introducing a 5-door sport wagon body style to the CTS-V vehicle line at the New York International Auto Show on March 29, 2010. Cadillac's "Art & Science" philosophy was demonstrated through the intake manifold that was integrated into the front fog lights, the distinctive bulge on the hood that contributed to creating an aerodynamic downforce at higher speeds, and the integrated-into-brake-light spoiler, which also was praised by car enthusiasts.

The CTS-V wagon shares the 556 hp (415 kW) engine and six-speed manual or automatic transmission, Magnetic Ride Control, Brembo brakes, 19-inch aluminum wheels and performance tires and a dual-airflow grille also used in the CTS-V sedan and coupe.

The CTS-V coupe debuted at the 2010 North American International Auto Show in Detroit, and entered production in summer 2010 as a 2011 model. It has the same 556 hp (415 kW) engine and transmission choices as the CTS-V sedan. The CTS-V Coupe features unique centered twin exhausts, a larger grille for air intake, and an optional "saffron" interior trim color. Like the CTS-V sedan, it comes standard with 19-inch aluminum wheels, Brembo brakes, and Magnetic Ride Control.

CTS Vday 
Released in China in 2012, the CTS Vday was a special edition commemorating Cadillac's 110th anniversary, which reflected the model's build count of 110. The CTS Vday does not have any changes to its 3.0 V6.

Third-generation V series

The third-generation V series included the sub-brand's flagship, CTS-V and the compact ATS-V. Unlike the first and second generations, where the CTS-V was the biggest update for the V series, the third-generation was the first expansion attempt on the V brand by Cadillac. Typically, the V series served as Cadillac's top-of-the-line trim level, and that mainly was exclusive to the CTS since that's where it all started. However, with such buzz created by the second-generation V series, and the short-lived record for a sedan on a demanding racetrack, Cadillac wanted to build on that success with other models in their lineup. This led them to create the Vsport, where potential buyers interested in the V series, could purchase a CTS with increased horsepower and sportier handling, can bypass the 'comfort & luxury' trims and get an entry-level 'performance' model for $20k less than the full-fledged CTS-V.

Vsport
Starting with XTS, the marque offers a step trim, called Vsport. The Vsport trim is the top of the XTS line, with a  turbocharged engine, producing . Both of them were the only "V"-badged vehicles of Cadillac until announcement of CTS-V and ATS-V.

For the 2016 model year, the trim was rebranded as V-Sport. The V-Sport trim designation was discontinued with the CTS and XTS sedan phase-outs in 2019 and 2020, respectively.

CTS-V
The CTS-V was powered by a supercharged version of the Corvette (C7) 6.2-liter LT4 V8 engine found on the Z06. Weighing , the CTS-V equipped with an 8-speed automatic transmission was able to do  at 3.6 seconds.

ATS-V Sedan and ATS-V Coupe
The Cadillac ATS-V sedan and coupe fill the gap left by the second-generation CTS-V. Cadillac made the first and second generation CTS smaller than BMW's 5-Series and larger than the 3-Series. The ATS-V is the first-ever V series Cadillac to be powered by a V6 rather than a V8.

Fourth-generation V series

The fourth-generation V series evolves away from "Art & Science" and ushers into Cadillac's new design language, beginning with the flagship CT6-V. Cadillac is also restructuring the V series with this generation. In place of the discontinued V-Sport introduced in the previous generation, Cadillac is repositioning the V models as an entry-level performance variant (with CT6 V-Sport being renamed CT6-V right before launch), and introducing a new top-level V series trim dubbed; V Blackwing (after the engine used in the CT6-V), taking the place of the previous generation V models (e.g. the CTS-V being directly replaced by the CT5-V Blackwing). This pushes the V models to serve as an mid-level trim in Cadillac's entire trim levels (even non-performance models) and features smaller engines rather than V8s. The move is aimed to make better use of the V series sub-brand and spread it into a price range of two categories instead of just one. Also new to the fourth-generation V series, is the ability to add Cadillac's Platinum package for the first time on a V model.

CT6-V
The CT6-V also included all-wheel drive, making it the first V series ever to feature AWD, and the first Cadillac sedan ever to feature a V8 with AWD.

With the remarkably lightweight Omega Platform, active rear-wheel steering, and all-wheel drive, the CT6-V redefined performance for a vehicle of its size. It was the most agile and nimble full-size luxury sedan in the world.

The CT6-V does  in 3.8 seconds, just 0.2 seconds more than the third-generation CTS-V.

Prior to official production and release, CT6’s with the 550hp Blackwing V8 were designated as V-Sport models. Upon official production the model designation was changed to “CT6-V”. CT6’s with the 500hp Blackwing V8 were designated as CT6 Platinum.

CT5-V
Replacing the CTS and powered by the  generating 3.0-liter LGY twin-turbo V6. Sent to the wheels via the new GM 10-Speed automatic transmission. The 335hp CT5-V features Magnetic Ride Control and electronic limited-slip differential. On the steering wheel there's a new button called "V-Mode", which activates a driver preset custom settings, such as the engine sounds, steering, suspension, powertrain, and brake response.

CT4-V
The CT4-V includes Magnetic Ride Control and Brembo brakes as standard. The same "V-Mode" button available in the CT5-V is also found in the CT4-V.

CT5-V Blackwing and CT4-V Blackwing
The 2022 CT5-V Blackwing was announced in February 2021 to have a 6.2 liter supercharged 668 hp pushrod V-8 engine. The 2022 CT4-V Blackwing was announced at the same time, with a 472 hp twin-turbo 3.6 liter V6.

Escalade-V
A high-performance version of the full-sized Cadillac Escalade SUV, the Escalade-V, was announced in late January 2022 for the 2023 model year. The Escalade-V is expected to have a supercharged LT4 V-8, also used to power the CT5-V Blackwing sedan. More details will be released in the Spring of 2022 and the car will start arriving on dealerships in the second half of 2022.

Motorsports 

Cadillac ATS-V.R

Cadillac DPi-V.R

Cadillac V-Series.R

References

V series
Car brands
Official motorsports and performance division of automakers